The National Youth Theatre of Great Britain (NYT) is a youth theatre and registered charity in London. Its aim is to develop and nurture young people through creative arts and theatrical productions. Founded in 1956 as the world's first youth theatre, the NYT has built a reputation for producing actors such as Daniel Craig, Daniel Day-Lewis, Timothy Dalton, Chiwetel Ejiofor, Colin Firth, Derek Jacobi, Ben Kingsley, Ian McShane, Helen Mirren, Lysette Anthony, Rosamund Pike, Regé-Jean Page and Kate Winslet, among numerous others.

The NYT holds annual acting auditions and technical theatre interviews around the United Kingdom, receiving an average of over 5,000 applicants. Currently, around 500 places are offered on summer acting and technical courses (costume, lighting and sound, scenery and prop making, and stage management), which offer participants NYT membership upon completion. Members are then eligible to audition for the company's productions, which are staged in London's West End, around the country, and internationally.

NYT members staged the Olympic and Paralympic Team Welcome Ceremonies at the 2012 Summer Olympics in London. In 2013, the NYT raised their age limit to 25 and introduced a new summer course called Epic Stages to cater for performance and production talent between ages 18–25. In summer 2014, members staged the Village Ceremonies at the 2014 Commonwealth Games in Glasgow.

In 2018 Akshay Sharan won Best Actor in a Play at The Stage Debut Awards for his lead performance in The Reluctant Fundamentalist, Mohsin Hamid's Manbooker Prize shortlisted novel, which National Youth Theatre commissioned Stephanie Street to adapt and which they produced to critical acclaim at the Finborough Theatre, Yard Theatre and Edinburgh Festival,

History

The world's first youth theatre, the National Youth Theatre was founded in 1956 by Michael Croft and Kenneth Spring. As Head of the English Department, Croft had been responsible for producing a number of school plays at Alleyn's Boys' School. Following his departure, he was approached by a number of pupils from the school to continue working together on productions during school holidays. Their first production of Henry V created something of a stir; at the time, it was unusual for young actors to be performing Shakespeare, and this innovative venture attracted the attention of a curious public. The first audiences included actors Richard Burton and Sir Ralph Richardson, with Richardson agreeing to become the first President of what Croft called The Youth Theatre. The organisation evolved rapidly throughout the United Kingdom, involving young people on a national basis.

Croft died in 1986 and was succeeded by Edward Wilson as Director. Building on Croft's vision, Wilson took the company forward into new territory, increasing its range of activities and reinforcing its approach to technical production values. Wilson also recognised the opportunity to extend the organisation to more disadvantaged young people, and started the first Outreach department in 1989, working initially with young offenders and gradually widening the opportunities to other socially excluded groups. Wilson also secured the organisation's current headquarters in north London, which now houses all of its production facilities, including rehearsal rooms, scenery and costume workshops, sound studios, photographic dark rooms, and administration offices.

Wilson left the company in 2004. Sid Higgins (Executive Director), John Hoggarth (Artistic Director), and Paul Roseby (Artistic Director) took over. Since then, they have built on the legacy inherited from Croft and Wilson, and the organisation has continued to expand its opportunities to young people from a more diverse background through a wider range of theatrical projects and collaborations. Hoggarth stepped down in 2007 and Roseby continues as the organisation's Artistic Director. In 2010, the National Youth Theatre moved administrative offices from Holloway Road to the Woolyard on Bermondsey Street; since 2016, it has been based on Bayham Street in Camden Town. In January 2012, Roseby became CEO while retaining his position as Artistic Director.

In 2012 the company suffered major issues with its finances and was bailed out with £680,000 from Arts Council England.

Traditionally, the National Youth Theatre has done most of its work with members in the summer months, but this is changing more and more. Creative events and performances take place throughout the year, courses take place in school holidays and throughout term time, and the company continues to expand its work with young people from all areas of the community. In summer 2012, the National Youth Theatre created and performed the Welcome Ceremonies for the London Olympics and Paralympics teams, with 200 members welcoming 20,000 athletes to Athletes' Village with 200 performances.

Following a pilot in 2012, the National Youth Theatre's first official REP Company was formed in April 2013. Inspired by the traditional repertory theatre model, the REP Company course offers free, practical, industry-based talent development in drama and performance over nine months to 16 NYT members. The National Youth Theatre also currently runs Playing Up, an OCN Level 3 accredited 10 month drama training programme, offering young people aged 19 to 24 who are not in education, employment, or training the opportunity to gain an access to higher education diploma in Theatre Arts, which is equivalent to two A Levels.

In 2016, the National Youth Theatre celebrated its 60th anniversary. The celebrations culminated in a 60th Anniversary Gala performance, The Story of Our Youth, featuring alumni including Matt Smith, Gina McKee, Daisy Lewis, Jessica Hynes, and Hugh Bonneville.

Barbara Broccoli succeeded Lord Waheed Alli and became the NYT's first female President in 2017. The National Youth Theatre's Royal Patron is the Duke of Edinburgh. 2017 marked 50 years since the staging of the National Youth Theatre's first ever commission, Zigger Zagger by Peter Terson, and to mark the occasion an anniversary production was staged at Wilton's Music Hall.

NYT's first ever East End season was launched in Hackney Wick in 2017, which saw the NYT on "exuberantly good form". Autumn 2017 saw the fifth anniversary of the NYT REP West End season at the Ambassadors Theatre, featuring performances Jekyll and Hyde, Othello, and Mrs Dalloway. 2018 saw the NYT REP Season move away from the Ambassadors Theatre, to the Soho Theatre, the Garrick Theatre and the Lyric Hammersmith, with performances of Consensual, Victoria's Knickers, and a female-led Macbeth abridged by Moira Buffini, as well as a production of To Kill a Mockingbird.

In 2018 the NYT REP Company's production of Macbeth was the first in London's West End to cast the lead role with a female actor, in a gender-fluid production adapted by Moira Buffini, directed by Natasha Nixon at the Garrick Theatre.

In 2020, during the crisis in live performance and theatre resulting from the COVID-19 pandemic, outdoor performance was reintroduced to Soulton Hall. NYT gave their first live in person performance since the restrictions following the lockdown that was brought about by the COVID-19 pandemic. The play was a new, specially devised work called The Last Harvest In 2021, the NYT returned to Soulton with a performance of Animal Farm.

In 2021 National Youth Theatre launched a Inclusive Practice Collective creating 60 paid roles and bringing drama to young disabled people in 15 schools in Greater Manchester, West Yorkshire and London as part of the KickStart scheme. In November, National Youth Theatre performed at the UN’s Global Climate Conference COP26 staging a Climate Caberet and Adeola Yemitan’s I Don’t Care. 2021 also saw National Youth Theatre Complete a major redevelopment of its north London Creative Production House on Holloway Road. In 2022 the redeveloped won the award for Best Cultural Building at the 2022 Architects' Journal Retrofit Awards, it also won The Mayor’s Award for Good Growth and Best Heritage or Culture Project at the Building London Planning Awards. As part of the redevelopment, a brand new ‘Workshop Theatre’ was created. In 2022, The First Production was staged in the new Venue, with the 21-22 Playing Up Company production double bill of ‘Boy/Girl/Boy/Girl’ by Tife Kusoro and ‘Mess’ By Urielle Klein-Mekongo

Alumni

Past productions 
For a full list of past productions, see National Youth Theatre Past Productions.

References

External links
 
 
 The National Council for Voluntary Youth Services (NCVYS)

Theatre companies in London
Youth theatre companies
1956 establishments in the United Kingdom